Kevin P. Murphy (born 1965) is a former Democratic member of the Pennsylvania House of Representatives. As a freshman legislator, he regularly worked at his district office's unique drive-through window designed to speed constituent service.

References

External links
Pennsylvania House of Representatives - Kevin P. Murphy (Democrat) official PA House website
Pennsylvania House Democratic Caucus - Kevin P. Murphy official Party website

Living people
Democratic Party members of the Pennsylvania House of Representatives
Politicians from Scranton, Pennsylvania
1965 births